Anthidium bechualandicum is a species of bee in the family Megachilidae, the leaf-cutter, carder, or mason bees.

Synonyms
Synonyms for this species include:
Anthidium michaelis bechuanlandicum Mavromoustakis, 1939

References

bechualandicum
Insects described in 1939